Christopher Willoughby may refer to:

Christopher Willoughby (World Bank Group) of the World Bank Group
 Christopher Willoughby (MP) (by 1508–70), MP for Wilton and Wiltshire
Christopher Willoughby-Drupe, Tintin character
Christopher Willoughby, 10th Baron Willoughby de Eresby (1453 – 1498/1499)
Sir Christopher Willoughby, 1st Baronet (1748-1808) of the Willoughby baronets
Sir Christopher William Willoughby, 2nd Baronet (1793-1813) of the Willoughby baronets
Chris Willoughby, pseudonym of Amy Witting